The following is a partial list of the "C" codes for Medical Subject Headings (MeSH), as defined by the United States National Library of Medicine (NLM).

This list continues the information at List of MeSH codes (C17). Codes following these are found at List of MeSH codes (C19). For other MeSH codes, see List of MeSH codes.

The source for this content is the set of 2006 MeSH Trees from the NLM.

– nutritional and metabolic diseases

– metabolic diseases

– acid-base imbalance
  – achlorhydria
  – acidosis
  – acidosis, lactic
  – acidosis, renal tubular
  – acidosis, respiratory
  – diabetic ketoacidosis
  – ketosis
  – alkalosis
  – alkalosis, respiratory

– amyloidosis
  – amyloid neuropathies
  – amyloid neuropathies, familial
  – amyloidosis, familial
  – amyloid neuropathies, familial
  – cerebral amyloid angiopathy, familial
  – cerebral amyloid angiopathy
  – cerebral amyloid angiopathy, familial

– brain diseases, metabolic
  – brain diseases, metabolic, inborn
  – abetalipoproteinemia
  – carbamoyl-phosphate synthase I deficiency disease
  – citrullinemia
  – galactosemias
  – Hartnup disease
  – hepatolenticular degeneration
  – homocystinuria
  – hyperargininemia
  – hyperglycinemia, nonketotic
  – hyperlysinemias
  – Leigh disease
  – Lesch–Nyhan syndrome
  – lysosomal storage diseases, nervous system
  – fucosidosis
  – glycogen storage disease type II
  – mucolipidoses
  – sialic acid storage disease
  – sphingolipidoses
  – fabry disease
  – gangliosidoses
  – gangliosidoses GM2
  – Sandhoff disease
  – Tay–Sachs disease
  – Tay–Sachs disease, AB variant
  – gangliosidosis gm1
  – Gaucher disease
  – leukodystrophy, globoid cell
  – leukodystrophy, metachromatic
  – Niemann–Pick diseases
  – maple syrup urine disease
  – MELAS syndrome
  – Menkes kinky hair syndrome
  – MERRF syndrome
  – oculocerebrorenal syndrome
  – ornithine carbamoyltransferase deficiency disease
  – peroxisomal disorders
  – adrenoleukodystrophy
  – Refsum disease
  – Zellweger syndrome
  – phenylketonurias
  – phenylketonuria, maternal
  – pyruvate carboxylase deficiency disease
  – pyruvate dehydrogenase complex deficiency disease
  – tyrosinemias
  – hepatic encephalopathy
  – kernicterus
  – mitochondrial encephalomyopathies
  – myelinolysis, central pontine
  – Reye syndrome
  – Wernicke encephalopathy

– calcium metabolism disorders
  – calcinosis
  – calciphylaxis
  – CREST syndrome
  – nephrocalcinosis
  – decalcification, pathologic
  – hypercalcemia
  – hypocalcemia
  – tetany
  – osteomalacia
  – pseudohypoparathyroidism
  – pseudopseudohypoparathyroidism
  – rickets

– DNA repair-deficiency disorders
  – ataxia–telangiectasia
  – Bloom syndrome
  – Cockayne syndrome
  – colorectal neoplasms, hereditary nonpolyposis
  – fanconi anemia
  – Li–Fraumeni syndrome
  – Nijmegen breakage syndrome
  – Rothmund–Thomson syndrome
  – severe combined immunodeficiency
  – Werner syndrome
  – xeroderma pigmentosum

– dyslipidemias
  – hyperlipidemia
  – hypercholesterolemia
  – hypercholesterolemia, familial
  – hyperlipidemia, familial combined
  – hypercholesterolemia, familial
  – hyperlipoproteinemia type IV
  – hypertriglyceridemia
  – hyperlipoproteinemia
  – hypercholesterolemia, familial
  – hyperlipoproteinemia type III
  – hyperlipoproteinemia type IV
  – hyperlipoproteinemia type V
  – lipoprotein lipase deficiency, familial
  – hypolipoproteinemia
  – abetalipoproteinemia
  – hypobetalipoproteinemia
  – lecithin acyltransferase deficiency
  – tangier disease

– glucose metabolism disorders
  – diabetes mellitus
  – diabetes mellitus, experimental
  – diabetes mellitus, type 1
  – wolfram syndrome
  – diabetes mellitus, type 2
  – diabetes mellitus, lipoatrophic
  – diabetes, gestational
  – diabetic ketoacidosis
  – prediabetic state
  – glycosuria
  – glycosuria, renal
  – hyperglycemia
  – glucose intolerance
  – hyperinsulinism
  – insulin resistance
  – metabolic syndrome x
  – persistent hyperinsulinemia hypoglycemia of infancy
  – hypoglycemia
  – insulin coma
  – persistent hyperinsulinemia hypoglycemia of infancy

– hyperammonemia

– hyperamylasemia

– hyperbilirubinemia
  – hyperbilirubinemia, neonatal
  – jaundice, neonatal
  – kernicterus

– hyperoxaluria
  – hyperoxaluria, primary

– hyperprolactinemia

– hyperuricemia

– hypervitaminosis A

– iron metabolism disorders
  – anemia, iron-deficiency
  – iron overload
  – hemochromatosis
  – hemosiderosis

– malabsorption syndromes
  – blind loop syndrome
  – celiac disease
  – lactose intolerance
  – sprue, tropical
  – steatorrhea
  – whipple disease

– metabolic syndrome x

– metabolism, inborn errors
  – amino acid metabolism, inborn errors
  – albinism
  – albinism, ocular
  – albinism, oculocutaneous
  – Hermansky–Pudlak syndrome
  – piebaldism
  – alkaptonuria
  – aminoaciduria, renal
  – cystinuria
  – Hartnup disease
  – carbamoyl phosphate synthase I deficiency disease
  – citrullinemia
  – homocystinuria
  – hyperargininemia
  – hyperglycinemia, nonketotic
  – hyperhomocysteinemia
  – hyperlysinemias
  – maple syrup urine disease
  – multiple carboxylase deficiency
  – biotinidase deficiency
  – holocarboxylase synthetase deficiency
  – ornithine carbamoyltransferase deficiency disease
  – phenylketonurias
  – phenylketonuria, maternal
  – tyrosinemias
  – amino acid transport disorders, inborn
  – hartnup disease
  – oculocerebrorenal syndrome
  – amyloidosis, familial
  – amyloid neuropathies, familial
  – cerebral amyloid angiopathy, familial
  – brain diseases, metabolic, inborn
  – abetalipoproteinemia
  – carbamoyl-phosphate synthase i deficiency disease
  – cerebral amyloid angiopathy, familial
  – citrullinemia
  – fucosidosis
  – galactosemias
  – glycogen storage disease type II
  – hartnup disease
  – hepatolenticular degeneration
  – homocystinuria
  – hyperargininemia
  – hyperglycinemia, nonketotic
  – hyperlysinemias
  – Leigh disease
  – Lesch–Nyhan syndrome
  – lysosomal storage diseases, nervous system
  – fucosidosis
  – glycogen storage disease type II
  – mucolipidoses
  – sialic acid storage disease
  – sphingolipidoses
  – Fabry disease
  – gangliosidoses
  – gangliosidoses GM2
  – Sandhoff disease
  – Tay–Sachs disease
  – Tay–Sachs disease, AB variant
  – gangliosidosis gm1
  – Gaucher disease
  – leukodystrophy, globoid cell
  – leukodystrophy, metachromatic
  – Niemann–Pick diseases
  – maple syrup urine disease
  – MELAS syndrome
  – menkes kinky hair syndrome
  – MERRF syndrome
  – mucolipidoses
  – oculocerebrorenal syndrome
  – ornithine carbamoyltransferase deficiency disease
  – peroxisomal disorders
  – adrenoleukodystrophy
  – refsum disease
  – Zellweger syndrome
  – phenylketonurias
  – phenylketonuria, maternal
  – pyruvate carboxylase deficiency disease
  – pyruvate dehydrogenase complex deficiency disease
  – sphingolipidoses
  – Fabry disease
  – gangliosidoses
  – gangliosidoses gm2
  – Sandhoff disease
  – Tay–Sachs disease
  – Tay–Sachs disease, AB variant
  – gangliosidosis gm1
  – Gaucher disease
  – leukodystrophy, globoid cell
  – leukodystrophy, metachromatic
  – Niemann–Pick diseases
  – tyrosinemias
  – carbohydrate metabolism, inborn errors
  – carbohydrate-deficient glycoprotein syndrome
  – fructose metabolism, inborn errors
  – fructose-1,6-diphosphatase deficiency
  – Hereditary fructose intolerance
  – fucosidosis
  – galactosemias
  – glycogen storage disease
  – glycogen storage disease type I
  – glycogen storage disease type II
  – glycogen storage disease type IIb
  – glycogen storage disease type III
  – glycogen storage disease type IV
  – glycogen storage disease type V
  – glycogen storage disease type VI
  – glycogen storage disease type VII
  – glycogen storage disease type VIII
  – hyperoxaluria, primary
  – lactose intolerance
  – mannosidase deficiency diseases
  – alpha-mannosidosis
  – beta-mannosidosis
  – mucolipidoses
  – mucopolysaccharidoses
  – mucopolysaccharidosis I
  – mucopolysaccharidosis II
  – mucopolysaccharidosis III
  – mucopolysaccharidosis IV
  – mucopolysaccharidosis VI
  – mucopolysaccharidosis VII
  – multiple carboxylase deficiency
  – biotinidase deficiency
  – holocarboxylase synthetase deficiency
  – pyruvate metabolism, inborn errors
  – Leigh disease
  – pyruvate carboxylase deficiency disease
  – pyruvate dehydrogenase complex deficiency disease
  – cytochrome-c oxidase deficiency
  – glucosephosphate dehydrogenase deficiency
  – hyperbilirubinemia, hereditary
  – Crigler–Najjar syndrome
  – gilbert disease
  – jaundice, chronic idiopathic
  – lipid metabolism, inborn errors
  – hypercholesterolemia, familial
  – hyperlipidemia, familial combined
  – hypercholesterolemia, familial
  – hyperlipoproteinemia type IV
  – hyperlipoproteinemia type III
  – hyperlipoproteinemia type IV
  – hyperlipoproteinemia type V
  – hypolipoproteinemia
  – abetalipoproteinemia
  – hypobetalipoproteinemia
  – lecithin acyltransferase deficiency
  – Tangier disease
  – lipoidosis
  – cholesterol ester storage disease
  – lipoidproteinosis
  – neuronal ceroid lipofuscinosis
  – Refsum disease
  – Sjögren–Larsson syndrome
  – sphingolipidoses
  – Fabry disease
  – gangliosidoses
  – gangliosidoses GM2
  – Sandhoff disease
  – Tay–Sachs disease
  – Tay–Sachs disease, AB variant
  – gangliosidosis gm1
  – Gaucher disease
  – leukodystrophy, globoid cell
  – leukodystrophy, metachromatic
  – Niemann–Pick diseases
  – sea-blue histiocyte syndrome
  – Wolman disease
  – lipoprotein lipase deficiency, familial
  – peroxisomal disorders
  – acatalasia
  – adrenoleukodystrophy
  – chondrodysplasia punctata, rhizomelic
  – Refsum disease
  – Zellweger syndrome
  – Smith–Lemli–Opitz syndrome
  – xanthomatosis, cerebrotendinous
  – lysosomal storage diseases
  – cholesterol ester storage disease
  – lysosomal storage diseases, nervous system
  – fucosidosis
  – glycogen storage disease type II
  – mucolipidoses
  – sialic acid storage disease
  – sphingolipidoses
  – Fabry disease
  – gangliosidoses
  – gangliosidoses GM2
  – Sandhoff disease
  – Tay–Sachs disease
  – Tay–Sachs disease, AB variant
  – gangliosidosis gm1
  – Gaucher disease
  – leukodystrophy, globoid cell
  – leukodystrophy, metachromatic
  – Niemann–Pick diseases
  – mannosidase deficiency diseases
  – alpha-mannosidosis
  – beta-mannosidosis
  – mucopolysaccharidoses
  – mucopolysaccharidosis I
  – mucopolysaccharidosis II
  – mucopolysaccharidosis III
  – mucopolysaccharidosis IV
  – mucopolysaccharidosis VI
  – mucopolysaccharidosis VII
  – sphingolipidoses
  – Fabry disease
  – gangliosidoses
  – gangliosidoses GM2
  – Sandhoff disease
  – Tay–Sachs disease
  – Tay–Sachs disease, AB variant
  – Gaucher disease
  – leukodystrophy, globoid cell
  – leukodystrophy, metachromatic
  – Niemann–Pick diseases
  – sea-blue histiocyte syndrome
  – Wolman disease
  – metal metabolism, inborn errors
  – hemochromatosis
  – hepatolenticular degeneration
  – hypophosphatasia
  – hypophosphatemia, familial
  – Menkes kinky hair syndrome
  – paralyses, familial periodic
  – hypokalemic periodic paralysis
  – paralysis, hyperkalemic periodic
  – pseudohypoparathyroidism
  – pseudopseudohypoparathyroidism
  – porphyria, erythropoietic
  – porphyrias, hepatic
  – coproporphyria, hereditary
  – porphyria, acute intermittent
  – porphyria cutanea tarda
  – porphyria, hepatoerythropoietic
  – porphyria, variegate
  – protoporphyria, erythropoietic
  – progeria
  – purine–pyrimidine metabolism, inborn errors
  – gout
  – arthritis, gouty
  – Lesch–Nyhan syndrome
  – renal tubular transport, inborn errors
  – acidosis, renal tubular
  – aminoaciduria, renal
  – cystinuria
  – Hartnup disease
  – cystinosis
  – Fanconi syndrome
  – glycosuria, renal
  – hypophosphatemia, familial
  – oculocerebrorenal syndrome
  – pseudohypoaldosteronism
  – steroid metabolism, inborn errors
  – adrenal hyperplasia, congenital
  – mineralocorticoid excess syndrome, apparent
  – ichthyosis, x-linked
  – Smith–Lemli–Opitz syndrome

– mitochondrial diseases
  – cytochrome-c oxidase deficiency
  – Friedreich's ataxia
  – optic atrophy, hereditary, leber
  – Leigh disease
  – mitochondrial myopathies
  – mitochondrial encephalomyopathies
  – MELAS syndrome
  – MERRF syndrome
  – ophthalmoplegia, chronic progressive external
  – Kearns–Sayre syndrome
  – optic atrophy, autosomal dominant
  – pyruvate carboxylase deficiency disease
  – pyruvate dehydrogenase complex deficiency disease

– ochronosis

– phosphorus metabolism disorders
  – hypophosphatemia

– skin diseases, metabolic
  – adiposis dolorosa
  – porphyrias
  – porphyria, erythropoietic
  – porphyrias, hepatic
  – coproporphyria, hereditary
  – porphyria, acute intermittent
  – porphyria cutanea tarda
  – porphyria, hepatoerythropoietic
  – porphyria, variegate
  – protoporphyria, erythropoietic
  – xanthogranuloma, juvenile
  – xanthomatosis
  – wolman disease
  – xanthomatosis, cerebrotendinous

– wasting syndrome
  – hiv wasting syndrome

– water-electrolyte imbalance
  – dehydration
  – hypercalcemia
  – hyperkalemia
  – hypernatremia
  – hypocalcemia
  – hypokalemia
  – hyponatremia
  – inappropriate adh syndrome
  – water intoxication

– nutrition disorders

– child nutrition disorders

– infant nutrition disorders
  – hemorrhagic disease of newborn

– malnutrition
  – deficiency diseases
  – avitaminosis
  – ascorbic acid deficiency
  – scurvy
  – vitamin A deficiency
  – vitamin B deficiency
  – choline deficiency
  – folic acid deficiency
  – pellagra
  – riboflavin deficiency
  – thiamine deficiency
  – beriberi
  – wernicke encephalopathy
  – vitamin B6 deficiency
  – vitamin B12 deficiency
  – anemia, pernicious
  – vitamin D deficiency
  – osteomalacia
  – rickets
  – vitamin E deficiency
  – steatitis
  – vitamin K deficiency
  – hemorrhagic disease of newborn
  – magnesium deficiency
  – potassium deficiency
  – protein deficiency
  – protein-energy malnutrition
  – kwashiorkor
  – swayback
  – fetal nutrition disorders
  – starvation

– overnutrition
  – obesity
  – obesity hypoventilation syndrome
  – obesity, morbid
  – Prader–Willi syndrome

– wasting syndrome
  – hiv wasting syndrome

The list continues at List of MeSH codes (C19).

C18